A Minute to Pray, a Second to Die is a 1968 Italian Spaghetti Western. It is the fourth and last western directed by Franco Giraldi. It was originally intended as being directed by Sergio Corbucci and the cast was to include also Raffaella Carrà and Renzo Palmer. The American version of the film was heavily cut, with a runtime 16 minutes shorter than the original version and featuring a different ending.

Plot
Clay McCord is a wanted criminal. He frequently suffers with fits which hinder him to defend himself. His condition seems to deteriorate continuously. Seeking shelter he enters the lawless town Escondido although it is currently under siege by a high-ranked law enforcement officer. There he gets to know the young Laurinda and finds a doctor who discovers the reason for his fits. Unlike he feared he's not epileptic and can be cured for good. Yet he's still an outlaw and that is in the end his downfall.

Cast 
 Alex Cord as Clay McCord
 Arthur Kennedy as Tuscosa Marshal Roy W. Colby
 Robert Ryan as New Mexico Gov. Lem Carter
 Nicoletta Machiavelli as Laurinda
 Mario Brega as Krant
 Enzo Fiermonte as Dr. Chase
 Giampiero Albertini as Fred Duskin
 Renato Romano as 'Cheap' Charlie
 Franco Lantieri as Deputy Marshal Butler
 John Bartha as Cittadino
 José Canalejas as Seminole - Bounty Hunter
 Daniel Martín as Father Santana
 Antonio Molino Rojo as Sein
 Lorenzo Robledo as Bounty Hunter
 Aldo Sambrell as Jesús María
 Antonio Vico as Jonas

Release
A Minute to Pray, a Second to Die was released in 1968. According to ABC records, the movie made a loss of $165,000. The film has also been released as Dead or Alive, Outlaw Gun, and Escondido. The film's title was A Minute to Pray, a Second to Die on its distribution in Canada and the United States, while foreign prints, released by Columbia Pictures, extended the film's runtime and featured a different ending. The film was released on VHS and Betamax in 1988; it is the only release on the Playhouse Video label to be rated R by the MPAA.

Reception
In a contemporary review, "Murf." of Variety stated that like other Italian Westerns, "brutality is laid on with a trowel, but herein with at least a modicum of taste and plot motivation." A review in the Monthly Film Bulletin noted that "there are moments in this rather rambling Western which suggest that, given a more coherent script, Franco Giraldi might at least emerge as a front runner in the Italian imitation stakes" noting an "imaginatively directed gun battle set in a church" in the beginning of the film.

See also
 List of Italian films of 1968

References

Footnotes

Sources

External links

1968 films
1960s Italian-language films
English-language Italian films
Spaghetti Western films
ABC Motion Pictures films
Films directed by Franco Giraldi
Films scored by Carlo Rustichelli
1968 Western (genre) films
Films shot in Almería
1960s Italian films